Agrippina is a 1911 Italian silent historical film directed by Enrico Guazzoni and starring Adele Bianchi Azzarili, Amleto Novelli and Maria Caserini. The film portrays the life of Agrippina the Younger, and was part of the move towards Roman epics in early Italian cinema.

Cast
 Adele Bianchi Azzarili
 
 Maria Caserini
 Giovanni Dolfini
 Amleto Novelli

References

Bibliography 
 Moliterno, Gino. Historical Dictionary of Italian Cinema. Scarecrow Press, 2008.

External links 
 

1911 films
Italian historical drama films
Italian silent short films
1910s Italian-language films
Italian short films
Films directed by Enrico Guazzoni
1910s historical drama films
Films set in ancient Rome
Films set in the Roman Empire
Italian black-and-white films
1911 drama films
Articles containing video clips
Silent historical drama films